Homoeosoma oslarellum is a species of snout moth in the genus Homoeosoma. It was described by Harrison Gray Dyar Jr. in 1905. It is found in California, United States.

References

Moths described in 1905
Phycitini